Imtiyaz Jaleel Syed (born 10 August 1968), also known as Syed Imtiyaz Jaleel, is an Indian politician and member of the All India Majlis-e-Ittehadul Muslimeen. In 2019 General Elections, Jaleel was elected as Member of Parliament, Lok Sabha from Chhatrapati Sambhajinagar Lok Sabha Constituency. He was elected as member of Maharashtra Legislative Assembly from Chhatrapati Sambhajinagar Central constituency in 2014. He is also the state president of All India Majlis-e-Ittehadul Muslimeen in Maharashtra as well as a member of the Standing Committee of the Urban Development (UD).

Early life
Jaleel was born and raised in Aurangabad to Syed Abdul Jaleel and Zakiya Jaleel. His father was a civil surgeon and his brother is a manager at Jet Airways. Jaleel married Roomi Fatema on 8 July 1993, with whom he has two children.

Jaleel completed both his Master of Business Administration (1996) and Master of Mass Communication and Journalism (2000) from Dr. Babasaheb Ambedkar Marathwada University.

Political career
Initially Jaleel worked as a journalist for Lokmat and NDTV. He entered politics in 2014 when he contested assembly seat from Aurangabad Central assembly constituency for All India Majlis-e-Ittehadul Muslimeen (MIM). He started his campaign 22 days before the polling and defeated the sitting Shiv Sena legislator Pradeep Jaiswal by a margin of around 20,000 votes.

On 23 April 2015, under the leadership of Imtiaz Jaleel, MIM won 25 seats in the Aurangabad Municipal Corporation elections. During DPDC meeting which was held on 29 January 2015, Imtiyaz Jaleel raised the issue of costly MRI charges at the government-run hospital in Aurangabad. Then District Guardian Minister Ramdas Kadam directed GMCH authorities to reduce the charges of MRI scan from Rs 1,800 to Rs 700.

On 14 October 2017, Imtiyaz Jaleel had filed a public interest litigation (PIL) before the Aurangabad bench of Bombay high court, seeking direction to the state government to allot seven acres of land to build a 200-bed hospital for women and children in Aurangabad. The court had directed the state and district administration to file a reply within six months.

On 26 March 2019, MIM decided to contest Aurangabad Lok Sabha seat in Maharashtra in alliance with the Vanchit Bahujan Aghadi led by Prakash Ambedkar. MIM President Asaduddin Owaisi had picked Imtiyaz Jaleel as the party candidate.

Jaleel won the Aurangabad Lok Sabha seat defeating the four-time sitting MP from the Shiv Sena, Chandrakant Khaire, with a slim margin of 4,492 vote. Commenting on the results, Chitra Lele, professor of political science at SNDT University said, “By not raking up national issues and shunning criticism of Narendra Modi, Jaleel avoided polarisation of votes on religious lines. On the other hand, a split in the votes going to Khaire, and AIMIM’s alliance with VBA ensured that he gets votes from dalits and other deprived communities”.

Since 2021, Jaleel sits on the Maharashtra Waqf Board.

Public activity
On 31 July 2017, Taslima Nasrin, a feminist known for her writing on criticism of religion, landed on Aurangabad Airport to visit Ajanta and Ellora caves. Led by Imtiaz Jaleel, a group of Muslims protested outside the Aurangabad Airport. After the backlash from protesters, Aurangabad police stopped the controversial author from stepping out of the airport and advised her to go back.

On 11 December 2021, Jaleel lead the Tiranga rally organised by the AIMIM party from Aurangabad to Mumbai demanding 5% reservation to the Muslim community in Maharashtra. Jaleel said that the AIMIM party won't contest the upcoming local body elections in Maharashtra if the MVA Government gives 5% reservation to the Muslim community.

Personal views
In February 2019, on the occasion of Shivaji Jayanti, Jaleel said Shivaji was a secular leader who stood for communal harmony but history books had been distorted to show him as anti Muslim.

References

External links
 Biography Profile at Lok Sabha, Parliament of India

1968 births
Living people
Maharashtra MLAs 2014–2019
Indian Muslims
All India Majlis-e-Ittehadul Muslimeen politicians
Dr. Babasaheb Ambedkar Marathwada University alumni
India MPs 2019–present
People from Aurangabad, Maharashtra